Dr. Samuel Vaughn Jump House is a historic home located at Perry Township, Delaware County, Indiana. It was built in 1848, and is a two-story, rectangular, Greek Revival style frame dwelling. It has a low hipped roof, small porch, and one-story wing.

It was added to the National Register of Historic Places in 1982.

References

Houses on the National Register of Historic Places in Indiana
Greek Revival houses in Indiana
Houses completed in 1848
Houses in Delaware County, Indiana
National Register of Historic Places in Delaware County, Indiana